San Luis Creek may refer to:

San Luis Creek (Colorado), a creek in Saguache County, Colorado
San Luis Creek (California), a creek in Merced County, California